FDN may refer to:

Politics 
 National Democratic Front (Mexico), a defunct political coalition
 National Democratic Front (Peru), a defunct political party
 New Democratic Forces, a defunct political party in the Republic of the Congo
 Nicaraguan Democratic Force, a Nicaraguan Contra group
 Nigerien Democratic Front, a defunct political party of Niger

Other uses 
 Dolphin Air, a defunct Ermirati airline
 Fairbanks Daily News-Miner, a newspaper in Fairbanks, Alaska, United States
 Faridabad New Town railway station, in Haryana, India
 Fixed Dialing Number
 Flying Doctors Nigeria
 French Data Network, a French non-profit Internet service provider
 Fruta del Norte mine, an Ecuadorian gold mine

See also 
 FND (disambiguation)
 NDF (disambiguation)